The 2009 NCAA men's volleyball tournament was the 40th annual tournament to determine the national champion of NCAA men's collegiate indoor volleyball. The single elimination tournament was played at Smith Fieldhouse in Provo, Utah during May 2009.

UC Irvine defeated USC in the final match, 3–2 (26–30, 30–23, 26–30, 30–17, 15–12), to win their second national title. The Anteaters (27–5) were coached by John Speraw.

UC Irvine's Ryan Ammerman was named the tournament's Most Outstanding Player. Ammerman, along with six other players, comprised the All Tournament Team.

Qualification
Until the creation of the NCAA Men's Division III Volleyball Championship in 2012, there was only a single national championship for men's volleyball. As such, all NCAA men's volleyball programs, whether from Division I, Division II, or Division III, were eligible. A total of 4 teams were invited to contest this championship.

Tournament bracket 
Site: Smith Fieldhouse, Provo, Utah

All tournament team 
Ryan Ammerman, UC Irvine (Most outstanding player)
Carson Clark, UC Irvine
Taylor Wilson, UC Irvine
Riley McKibbin, USC
Murphy Troy, USC
Austin Zahn, USC
Will Price, Penn State

See also 
 NCAA Men's National Collegiate Volleyball Championship
 NCAA Women's Volleyball Championships (Division I, Division II, Division III)

References

2009
NCAA Men's Volleyball Championship
NCAA Men's Volleyball Championship
2009 in sports in Utah
Volleyball in Utah